Yoo Sang-chul (18 October 1971 – 7 June 2021) was a South Korean football player and manager. Yoo was regarded as one of the greatest South Korean midfielders of all time. He was selected as a midfielder of the 2002 FIFA World Cup All-Star Team and K League 30th Anniversary Best XI.

Club career
In 1994, Yoo joined a K League club Ulsan Hyundai Horang-i, and was selected as a defender of the K League Best XI right after his first season. In 1996, he won the 1996 K League with Ulsan.  In 1998, he won the K League scoring title, scoring 14 goals in 20 games, and was named as a midfielder in the K League Best XI.

Yoo was offered a trial from Barcelona after the 1998 FIFA World Cup. However, confusion regarding how agents work in European football caused him to miss out on the trial; furthermore, his club Ulsan had already agreed to a contract-binding deal to sell him to Yokohama F. Marinos.

Yoo briefly joined Kashiwa Reysol in 2001, where he played 33 games and scored 14 goals.  Following his success at the 2002 FIFA World Cup, there was interest from many major European football clubs, and he nearly signed a deal with Tottenham Hotspur, to the point that he had already said farewell to Kashiwa; but the negotiation broke down.  Without a club, he returned to Ulsan after the registration deadline and was granted a special exemption to play with the team.  With only eight matches left in the 2002 season, he scored nine goals, helping Ulsan move from a mid-table position to a title challenge, finishing in second place. That season, he picked up another Best XI award as a forward, after finishing with the third-most goals in the league. He was one of only two players in K League history to have been included in all three outfield positions of the Best XI.

Back at Yokohama, Yoo won the J.League in 2003 and 2004, before returning to Ulsan and winning one more title in 2005.  Following that title, a chronic left knee injury forced him to retire from football.

International career
Yoo scored two goals for South Korea in FIFA World Cup, one in 1998 against Belgium, and another in 2002 against Poland. He played a key part of the South Korea national team when they reached the semi-finals in the 2002 FIFA World Cup, and was named to the World Cup all-star team.  He was also part of the South Korea under-23 team for the 2004 Summer Olympics, who finished second in Group A, making it through to the next round, before being defeated by Paraguay, the eventual silver medalists.

Style of play
Yoo was one of South Korea's most versatile players in the 1990s and 2000s. He was originally a defensive player, who could perform roles of stopper and right back with excellent physical strength, but he had the ability to spark attacks with his incisive distribution after getting great positioning and wide vision in his experiences. He could even be deployed as a forward, and he became the top goal-scorer of the league. His versatility allowed him to shine in almost any area of the field from defence to attack, and his presence allowed coach Guus Hiddink to alter tactics easily during World Cup matches. After his retirement, he shocked Koreans by revealing that he was blind in one eye during his career.

Managerial career
Yoo Sang-chul began managing in 2009 as a high school football manager, at Chuncheon Machinery Technical High School.

On 17 July 2011, he was appointed manager of Daejeon Citizen.  This was a tough appointment, because a match-fixing scandal caused Daejeon to lose nearly half of their players just before his appointment.  Then, in 2012, a relegation system was introduced, threatening the Citizens with relegation.  In the 2012 season, while it was close, the Daejeon Citizens managed to avoid relegation.  Following the expiration of his contract at the end of the 2012 season, negotiations to extend his contract failed, and the Daejeon Citizens appointed a different manager, a move which many fans found controversial.

In January 2014, Yoo became the manager of the Ulsan University football team, the affiliate university team of the Ulsan Hyundai football club where he had spent his entire K-League career.  He remained with Ulsan University until December 2017, when he was appointed manager of the Jeonnam Dragons.

Under Yoo, the Jeonnam Dragons attempted to reorganize the team around a youth movement.  However, the team struggled to score goals, and despite Yoo's request, they were unable to land a better forward.  His tenure at Jeonnam Dragons ended on August 16, 2018, when he resigned after only three victories, with the team doing poorly in the 2018 K League 1 standings.  Jeonnam Dragons would eventually be relegated at the end of the season.

On May 14, 2019, Yoo was appointed manager of Incheon United.  At the time of his appointment, Incheon United was at the bottom of the 2019 K League 1, with only 6 points in 11 games.   While managing Incheon United in October 2019, Yoo was diagnosed with stage 4 pancreatic cancer.  Despite the diagnosis, he continued to manage Incheon United and helped the club avoid relegation, before resigning in January 2020.  After resigning, he was named the honorary head coach.  In June 2020, when Incheon United had another managerial vacancy, Yoo approached the team and asked to be appointed the manager again, but he was turned down on account of his poor health.

Death
On 21 November 2019, Yoo announced that he had been diagnosed with stage 4 pancreatic cancer, which caused him to be hospitalised. Yoo died on 7 June 2021 in Seoul at the age of 49.

Career statistics

Club

International

Scores and results list Korea Republic's goal tally first, score column indicates score after each Yoo goal.

Honours
Ulsan Hyundai Horang-i
K League 1: 1996, 2005
Korean League Cup: 1995, 1998
Korean Super Cup: 2006
A3 Champions Cup: 2006

Yokohama F. Marinos
J1 League: 2003, 2004

South Korea B
Summer Universiade silver medal: 1993
East Asian Games: 1993

South Korea
FIFA World Cup fourth place: 2002
AFC Asian Cup third place: 2000
EAFF Championship: 2003

Individual
K League 1 Best XI: 1994, 1998, 2002
K League 1 top goalscorer: 1998
AFC Asian All Stars: 1998
World XI: 2000
FIFA World Cup All-Star Team: 2002
EAFF Championship Most Valuable Player: 2003
K League 30th Anniversary Best XI: 2013

See also
List of men's footballers with 100 or more international caps

Notes

References

External links
 
 
 

 International Appearances & Goals

1971 births
2021 deaths
South Korean footballers
Association football midfielders
South Korean expatriate footballers
South Korea international footballers
J1 League players
Ulsan Hyundai FC players
Yokohama F. Marinos players
Kashiwa Reysol players
1996 AFC Asian Cup players
1998 FIFA World Cup players
2000 CONCACAF Gold Cup players
2000 AFC Asian Cup players
2001 FIFA Confederations Cup players
2002 CONCACAF Gold Cup players
2002 FIFA World Cup players
Footballers at the 2004 Summer Olympics
Olympic footballers of South Korea
FIFA Century Club
Daejeon Hana Citizen FC managers
Konkuk University alumni
Footballers from Seoul
Footballers at the 1994 Asian Games
Footballers at the 1998 Asian Games
Asian Games competitors for South Korea
South Korean football managers
Universiade medalists in football
Universiade silver medalists for South Korea
Deaths from cancer in South Korea
Deaths from pancreatic cancer